Canada Basketball (CB) is a non-profit organization and the governing body for basketball in Canada. This national federation was founded in 1923. The organization is responsible for the selection and training of players who represent the Men's and Women's national teams and then represent Canada in international competition, including Olympic, Pan American and FISU Games, as well as the FIBA World Championships. The current President and CEO is Michael Bartlett.

In addition to its international programs, Canada Basketball oversees programs at amateur and grassroots levels throughout Canada. Some of the influential Canada Basketball Alumni include Steve Nash, Leo Rautins, Stacey Dales, and Lars Hansen. Canada Basketball launched the Steve Nash Youth Basketball Program in September, 2007. Basketball is the fastest growing sport in Canada, and attracts many young Canadians from all backgrounds.

In May 2012, Canada Basketball named Steve Nash the General Manager of the Senior Men's National Program. Canada Basketball hired Jay Triano to coach its Senior Men's National Team in August 2012, and hired Lisa Thomaidis as the head coach of the Senior Women's Program in March 2013. The Council Of Excellence is designed to strengthen the game of basketball in Canada as to propel Canadian Basketball back to international prominence. The Council Of Excellence includes, Jay Triano, Steve Nash, Maurizio Gherardini, Glen Grunwald, Don McCrae, Kathy Shields, Ken Shields, Steve Konchalski, and Sylvia Sweeney.

On March 5, 2019, Canada Basketball promoted Executive Vice President / Assistant General Manager Rowan Barrett to General Manager, while Steve Nash would transition to a role of Senior Advisor, effective immediately.  Barrett's first move was to hire Toronto Raptors head coach Nick Nurse to coach the national men's team at the 2019 FIBA World Cup with the hopes of qualifying for the 2020 Summer Olympics in Tokyo, Japan.

Canada Basketball withdrew its Men's national team from FIBA AmeriCup qualifying games against Cuba on 29 November 2020 and against the US Virgin Islands on 30 November 2020, on the advice of medical experts due to risks posed by the ongoing COVID-19 pandemic.  As a consequence on 20 January 2021 the International Basketball Federation announced sanctions against Canada Basketball consisting of a 160,000 Swiss francs fine and docking the Men's national team a point in the standings.

Canadian Basketball Hall of Fame

Athletes

Noel Robertson (1978)
Norman Baker (1979)
Carl Ridd (1980)
Phil Tollestrup (1991)
Jay Triano (1993)
Debbie Huband (1994)
Sylvia Sweeney (1994)
Martin Riley (1995)
Fred Thomas (1995)
Nora McDermott (1996)
Romel Raffin (1996)
Leo Rautins (1997)
Chris Critelli (1998)
Misty Thomas (1998)
Bill Rogin (1999)
Bob Houbregs (2000)
Jamie Russell (2000)
Joyce Slipp (2000)
Rita Bell (2001)
Barry Howson (2001)
John McKibbon (2001)
Warren Reynolds (2001)
Bev Smith (2001)
Fred Ingaldson (2002)
Bill Robinson (2002)
Gino Sovran (2002)
Patricia Tatham (2002)
Eli Pasquale (2003)
Gerald Kazanowski (2005)
Bill Wennington (2005)
Lars Hansen (2006)
Bob Phibbs (2007)
Andrea Blackwell (2013)
Bill Coulthard (2013)
Candace Jirik (2013)
George Stulac (2015)
Jim Zoet (2015)
Todd MacCulloch (2017)

Builders
Dr. James Naismith (1978)
Norman Gloag (1979)
Clarence Hollingsworth (1979)
Edward Patrick Browne (1989)
Eddie Bowering (2001)
Alex Fisher (2001)
Bob Gage (2001)
Gerri Livingston (2001)
Hank Tatarchuk (2003)
Olga Hrycak (2017)

Coaches
Dr. Percy Page (1978)
Frank Baldwin (1979)
Dr. Paul Thomas (1980)
Jack Donohue (1992)
Steve Konchalski (1993)
Ken Shields (1999)
James V. Rose (2001)
John Metras (2002)
Jack Kenyon (2003)
Kathy Shields (2003)

Officials
Kitch McPherson (1979)
Ted Earley (1992)
John Willox (1994)
Fred Horgan (1996)
Bryan Nicurity (1996)
Bill Ritchie (1997)
Al Rae (2000)
Ernest Quigley (2001)
John Weiland (2019)

Players
Patricia Lawson (2019)
Dianne Norman (2019)
Joanne Sargent (2019)
Mike Smrek (2019)

Teams
Edmonton Commercial Grads (1980)
1936 Olympic Ford V8's Team (1981)
Edmonton Grads (1983)
1992-94 Winnipeg Wesman Women's Team (1995)
1929-30 UBC Women's Team (2006)
1976 Senior Men's Olympic Team (2007)

Multiple categories
R. Ruby Richman (1980)
Darlene Currie (1994)
Don McCrae (1994)
Derek Sankey (1994)
Brian Heaney (1997)
Ron Foxcroft (1999)
Hank Biasatti (2001)
Stanley Nantais (2001)
Howard Kelsey (2019)

References

External links 
 

Basketball governing bodies in Canada
Basketball